Jigsaw is a 1962 British black and white crime film written and directed by Val Guest and starring Jack Warner and Ronald Lewis. It is based on the police procedural novel Sleep Long, My Love by Hillary Waugh, with the setting changed from the fictional small town of Stockford, Connecticut, to Brighton, Sussex, while retaining the names and basic natures of its two police protagonists and most of the other characters. It was filmed with the full cooperation of the Brighton Borough Police, which was under the shadow of a major corruption scandal, and the East Sussex Constabulary.

Plot
A woman (later explained as Jean Sherman) argues with an unseen man. She wants to marry him but he moves to attack her.

Her remains are found both dismembered and incinerated, together with a knife and a hacksaw in a small furnace in Saltdean, near Brighton. Two local detectives, following up a small but odd burglary of leases at an estate agent's office, discover the body and take on the investigation of the death. The dead woman cannot be identified but they initially think she is called Jean Sherman, since a suitcase with the initials JS had been left at the scene. The main suspect is an unidentified man who has used the false identity of John Campbell to rent the house in which the woman was found. The detectives methodically develop and follow up leads to identify both people, mostly in Brighton, but also further afield in Lewes and Greenwich.

DI Fellows goes to Jean Sherman's house and discovers that she is still alive. He tricks her into giving him a name and address to get a sample of her handwriting, which is the same as that found in the victim's house. Flashback scenes in her story specifically exclude the viewer from seeing the man John Campbell. Miss Sherman admits a one-night stand with Campbell.

They track down and arrest a suspect described by several persons as the man who occupied the house, but the case takes an unexpected turn when he admits that he was a door to door salesman who was with the victim but denies any involvement in her murder. His story checks out.

After the dead woman is positively identified, the veteran inspector leading the case has to tell the parents then develops a "wild idea" about the identity of another suspect, then orders a standard procedure that confirms his theory in a non-standard fashion. This suspect (Tenby) admits knowledge of the death but his contention that it was accidental appears to be unshakeable until the detectives realise that he has lied about a crucial detail: claiming to have bought something on a Monday bank holiday.

Cast
 Jack Warner as Detective Inspector Fred Fellows
 Ronald Lewis as Detective Sergeant Jim Wilks
 Yolande Donlan as Jean Sherman
 Michael Goodliffe as Clyde Burchard
 John Le Mesurier as Mr Simpson
 Moira Redmond as Joan Simpson  
 Christine Bocca as Mrs Simpson  
 Brian Oulton as Frank Restlin  
 Ray Barrett as Sergeant Gorman  
 Norman Chappell as Andy Roach  
 John Barron as Ray Tenby
 Joan Newell as Mrs Banks

Critical response
Britmovie wrote that Jigsaw is "a chilling murder mystery," adding that, "at 107 minutes, the film is long but never tiresome"; while The Guardian described the film as "one of the finest postwar British crime movies and possibly the best depiction of the seaside town on film. Caught in its seedy corruption, Brighton emerges as a far cry from the bumbling world with which (Val) Guest had until then been associated."

The Duke of Edinburgh once asked the director what he was currently doing, and Guest replied that he was working on "Jigsaw". The Duke thought working on a murder mystery with the Brighton police would be "bloody boring".

Notes
Footnotes

References

The film was shot in CinemaScope, but this is uncredited.

External links
 

1962 films
1962 crime drama films
1960s mystery films
British crime drama films
British mystery films
1960s English-language films
Films about murder
1960s police procedural films
Films directed by Val Guest
Films set in Brighton
Films shot at Associated British Studios
Films shot in East Sussex
1960s British films